Clan Macnab is a Highland Scottish clan.

History

Origins of the clan

Traditional origins

The name Macnab is derived from the Scottish Gaelic Mac An Aba, which means child of the abbot. According to tradition the progenitor of the clan was Abraruadh who was the Abbot of Glen Dochart and Strathearn. Abraruadh was allegedly a younger son of Kenneth MacAlpin, the first king of Scots. (See: Siol Alpin). Abraruadh was also descended from Fergus, king of Dál Riata and a nephew of Saint Fillan, who was the founder of the monastery in Glen Dochart in the seventh century.

Recorded origins

One of the earliest records of the Macnab family is on a charter of 1124. Malcolm de Glendochart appears in the Ragman Rolls of 1296 and submitted to Edward I of England.

14th century and Robert the Bruce

Angus Macnab was brother-in-law of John III Comyn, Lord of Badenoch who was murdered by Robert the Bruce in 1306. Macnab then joined forces with the Clan MacDougall in their campaign against the Bruce when Bruce was nearly captured at the Battle of Dalrigh. When the Bruce's power consolidated after his victory at the Battle of Bannockburn in 1314, the Macnab lands were forfeited and their charters were destroyed.

The fortunes of the Clan Macnab were restored to some extent when Angus's grandson, Gilbert, received a charter from David II of Scotland in 1336. Gilbert was succeeded by his son, Sir Alexander Macnab, who died in about 1407.

16th century and clan conflicts

Many battles were fought between the Clan Macnab and the Clan Neish. The last battle between them was the Battle of Glenboultachan where the Macnabs were victorious. The Neishes were killed almost to a man. However, some Neishes survived and continued to live on what they called Neish Island. The Neishes continued to plunder the neighbourhood and feuds continued.

17th century and civil war

Chief Finlay Macnab was a man of peace but protected his lands against the foraging royalist forces of James Graham, 1st Marquess of Montrose in the mid-1640s. However Finlay's son, who was known as Smooth John, did not follow his father's peaceful ways and actually joined forces with Montrose, contributing to the royal victory at the Battle of Kilsyth in 1645. Smooth John Macnab was appointed to garrison Montrose's own Kincardine Castle. General David Leslie, Lord Newark subsequently laid siege to the castle. The castle's whole garrison however, managed break through the Covenanter lines and fought their way clear, but John Macnab was captured. He was taken to Edinburgh and sentenced to death but escaped on the eve of his execution. He went on to lead three hundred of his clansmen at the Battle of Worcester in 1651.

On 13 July 1680 the Chief of Clan Macnab and his followers fought at the Battle of Altimarlach in support of Sir John Campbell of Glenorchy and against George Sinclair of Keiss, in a dispute over who had the right to the lands and title of the Earl of Caithness. Campbell won a decisive victory in the battle, but Sinclair later turned to the law and was awarded the title and the lands as Earl of Caithness.

18th century and Jacobite risings

Robert Macnab, the fourteenth chief of Clan Macnab married a sister of John Campbell, 1st Earl of Breadalbane and Holland. This connection to the Clan Campbell constrained him from supporting the Jacobites in the rising of 1715, although many of his clansmen did take part. The fifteenth chief was a major in the Hanoverian government army and was captured at the Battle of Prestonpans in 1745. He was then held prisoner in Doune Castle.

Clan Chief

The current chief is the 24th, James William Archibald Macnab of Macnab who succeeded his father, James Charles Macnab of Macnab, in 2013.

See also
Scottish clan

References

External links

Macnab